The 28 (and a half) Bolsheviks (二十八个半布尔什维克) were a group of Chinese students who studied at the Moscow Sun Yat-sen University from the late 1920s until early 1935, also known as the "Returned Students". The university was founded in 1925 as a result of Kuomintang's founder Sun Yat-Sen's policy of alliance with the Soviet Union, and was named after him. The university had an important influence on modern Chinese history by educating many prominent Chinese political figures. The most famous of these were collectively called the 28 Bolsheviks.

Members 
There are several rival lists of the 28. One lists 29 active members, including: Wang Ming and his wife Meng Qingshu (孟庆树); Bo Gu; Zhang Wentian; Wang Jiaxiang; Yang Shangkun; Chen Changhao with his wife Du Zuoxiang (杜作祥); Shen Zemin and his wife Zhang Qinqiu; Kai Feng; Xia Xi; He Zishu; Sheng Zhongliang; Wang Baoli (王宝礼); Wang Shengrong (王盛荣); Wang Yuncheng; Zhu Agen; Zhu Zishun (朱自舜, female); Sun Jimin (孙济民); Song Panmin; Chen Yuandao; Li Zhusheng; Li Yuanjie (李元杰); Wang Shengdi (汪盛荻); Xiao Tefu (肖特甫); Yin Jian; Yuan Jiayong, Xu Yixin. The extra person can be attributed to Xu Yixin because of his pendulous left and right stances and year under 18, and thus this group is also known as "28 and a half Bolsheviks".

Rise and fall 
With support from their mentor Pavel Mif, president of Sun Yat-sen University and envoy of Comintern at that time, they returned to China after graduating. This provoked a struggle with Li Lisan and his allies, who controlled the Chinese Communist Party (CCP). Dissidents against Li inside the Party also objected to their return, but, in the 4th Plenary Meeting of the Communist Party's 6th National Congress, and with the presence and direct support of Pavel Mif, Wang Ming and his group won a landslide victory. Wang was elected to the Communist Party's politburo, while Bo Gu and Zhang Wentian took up other, equally important, positions.

As a result, the conflict between the Central Committee and Mao Zedong's fledgling Chinese Soviet Republic began once again. Although Wang Ming returned to Moscow after a short stay in Shanghai, Bo Gu and Zhang Wentian both took the position of General Secretary of Central Committee of the Party in turn, and led the Chinese revolution in a radical/pro-left manner.

Following Chiang Kai-shek's Shanghai massacre of 1927,  the CCP went deep underground in Shanghai and other cities. By the early 1930s, even that was unsafe and leaders began to converge at Mao Zedong's Jiangxi Soviet. Among the first to arrive, and to begin dismantling Mao's power, was Zhou Enlai. In 1933, when Bo Gu arrived, the job was mostly finished.

After a series of successful defenses against Nationalist Army attacks, Chiang's German advisers switched tactics and began building concentric circles of fortified positions closer and closer to the communist base. This forced the party to embark in the famous Long March of October 1934 to October 1935. Shortly after the march began, party leaders held an enlarged congress to determine the direction and leadership of the revolution. At the Zunyi Conference in 1935, the 28 Bolsheviks were defeated by Mao Zedong and his allies, primarily due to the backing of Zhou Enlai, and Zhu De and defecting of Zhou Wentian and Wang Jiaxiang.

Bo Gu supported the Comintern military advisor Otto Braun, while Zhang and Wang Jiaxiang, General Commissar of the Red Army, and Yang Shangkun, Commissar of the Third Field Army of Red Army at that time, defected to Mao. This led to the disintegration of the 28 Bolsheviks. Wang Ming was exiled to Moscow where he later died. Zhang was demoted to the field of ideological research in Yan'an, and later appointed Deputy Foreign Minister after 1949. He died during the Cultural Revolution after forming a "counterrevolutionary group" with Peng Dehuai (aka Peng Dehuai anti-party group). Bo Gu died in an air crash in the 1946 when he returned to Yan'an from Chongqing, temporary capital of Kuomingtang Government.

Disputes 
The standard Western interpretation is that the group neglected the contribution of peasants and land reform who contributed to the success of Mao's Mobile Warfare. Also, as protégés of Pavel Mif, they thought they were destined to take charge of the Chinese revolution

Thomas Kampen's Mao Zedong, Zhou Enlai and the Evolution of the Chinese Communist Leadership argues that they were only a coherent group in Moscow, opposed to both Kuomintang and Trotskyist influences among Chinese students. It is also claimed that they returned to China at various times but failed to form an effective faction. Additionally, there are questions as to whether the entire group gained notoriety only by association with the theories of the most prominent member, Wang Ming. Frederick Litten writes agreeing with Kampen that there was no such faction in the Jiangxi Soviet and goes further to question whether the group acted in any kind of coordinated way at all. Litten's view is that the idea of a 'Leftist' versus 'Maoist' dichotomy at the time is a later invention that was retrospectively applied.

The 28 Bolsheviks became pawns in the power struggle between their mentor, Pavel Mif, and the Communist Party of China. The group's members were relatively innocent in the ways of revolution despite their collective power. Its members had different fates, but as a group, the 28 Bolsheviks were destined to fail. Today in China, "the 28 Bolsheviks" is synonymous with dogmatism.

Later history 

 Wang Jiaxiang was eventually made Director of the CCP Central International Liaison Department after having also served for some time as the PRC's Ambassador to the Soviet Union. He died in the Cultural Revolution.
 Chen Changhao worked with Zhang Guotao when he returned from Moscow and became Zhang's Commissar, but lost power and influence in the struggle between Zhang and Mao. Chen Changhao went on to become a Communist Party historian, and committed suicide in the Cultural Revolution.
 He Kequan was General Secretary of the Chinese Communist Youth League, and later Deputy Director of the CCP Central Propaganda Department, and died in 1954.
 Xia Xi was sent to Hunan and carried out the purges which took the lives of more than forty thousand Red Army soldiers. He was later regarded as a public enemy. Perhaps because of this, no one came to his aid when he fell into a river and drowned during the Long March.
 Yang Shangkun survived the purges, including the Cultural Revolution. He later became the President of the PRC in the 1980s.
 Shen Zemin, the younger brother of writer Mao Dun, worked for Zhang Guotao and the 4th Red Army. After Zhang's army was defeated, Shen remained at the Communist base in Anhui and died of tuberculosis in 1933.
 Zhang Qinqiu, Shen Zemin's wife, married Chen Changhao after Shen's death. She is often considered the only "woman general" of the Red Army (which never formally awarded military ranks). After 1949, she was appointed Deputy Minister of Textile Industry, but committed suicide in the Cultural Revolution.
 Yin Jian was arrested by Kuomintang when he mobilized workers in Northern China, and was subsequently executed.
 Li Zhusheng was promoted to the Politburo after Wang Ming's return to Moscow in 1931, and put in charge of the daily affairs of the Communist Party in Shanghai. He was later arrested, but defected to the Kuomintang, and informed on many of his former compatriots. After the KMT's defeat, Li was arrested by the Communists in Shanghai in 1951, and subsequently died in prison in 1973.
 Chen Yuandao was appointed as senior leader for the Jiangsu and Henan Division of the Communist Party, but was later arrested and executed by the Kuomintang in Nanjing.
 Xu Yixin worked for Zhang Guotao's 4th Red Army and became his vice general commissar, surviving war and party purges. After the establishment of the People's Republic of China, Xu held the position of ambassador in the Foreign Ministry. He died in the 1990s.
 Yuan Jiayong was appointed General Secretary of the Jiangsu Division in the Communist Party. Following his arrest in 1934, he defected to the Kuomintang and worked for the secret police.
 He Zishu worked for the Northern China Bureau of the Communist Party, and was executed by the Kuomintang in 1929.
 Wang Shengrong, a member of the first Central Military Commission of the Chinese Soviet Republic, survived both war and purges. He died on 1 September 2006 at the age of 99.
 Wang Yuncheng succeeded Wang Ming as General Secretary of the Jiangsu Division in the Communist Party. He was kidnapped by the Kuomintang and forced to work with Li Zhusheng in the secret police.
 Sheng Zhongliang was senior leader of the Shanghai Division in the Communist Party, and was sold out by Li Zhusheng. He was coerced into informing for the Kuomintang's secret police. Sheng, after moving to the US, later wrote memoirs of his time at the Sun Yat-sen University and with the 28 Bolsheviks.
 Song Panmin also worked for Zhang Guotao, but was executed when he objected to the purges being carried out by Xia Xi.
 Sun Jiming, a senior Communist Party leader, was arrested and defected to the Kuomintang together with Wang Yuncheng.
 Wang Shengdi and Zhu Agen left the Communist Party, though both had held senior positions.
 Wang Baoli, Zhu Zisun, Li Yuanjue, and Du Zuoxian left public life and their fates are not known.

References

Politics of the Republic of China (1912–1949)
Chinese communists
Chinese expatriates in the Soviet Union
Moscow Sun Yat-sen University alumni